Jacopo Gianelli (born 4 March 2001) is an Italian professional footballer who plays as a midfielder for Inter Milan.

Career statistics

Club

References

2001 births
Living people
People from Magenta, Lombardy
Footballers from Lombardy
Italian footballers
Association football midfielders
Serie C players
Inter Milan players
Pro Sesto 2013 players
Italy youth international footballers
Sportspeople from the Metropolitan City of Milan